Otey Cannon is an American former soccer forward who was the first black American player in the North American Soccer League.  He also played in the American Soccer League.

Cannon attended Chico State University where he played on the men's soccer team in 1970 and 1971.  Although he played only two season, his 42 goals puts him second on the team's career goals list.  Chico State inducted him into the Athletic Hall of Fame in 1995.

In 1972, Cannon turned professional with the Dallas Tornado of the North American Soccer League.  In 1974, Dallas traded him to the expansion Seattle Sounders.  In 1976, Cannon moved to the Sacramento Spirits of the American Soccer League.

References

External links
Career stats

1950 births
Living people
Soccer players from San Francisco
American soccer players
American Soccer League (1933–1983) players
Dallas Tornado players
North American Soccer League (1968–1984) players
North American Soccer League (1968–1984) indoor players
Sacramento Gold (1976–1980) players
Seattle Sounders (1974–1983) players
Chico State Wildcats men's soccer players
Association football forwards